The Archer class (or P2000) is a class of patrol and training vessel in service with the United Kingdom's Royal Navy, commonly referred to as a Fast Training Boat.

Development
Ten vessels were ordered as the P2000 class, based on a design of an Omani coastguard cutter, from Watercraft Marine. They are twin-shaft vessels with moulded glass-reinforced plastic hulls of  displacement. After that company went into liquidation, the balance of the order was completed by Vosper Thornycroft.

The Archers were initially used as Royal Navy patrol craft and as training tenders for the Royal Naval Reserve (RNR) and University Royal Naval Units (URNU). Four identical vessels were ordered for the Royal Naval Auxiliary Service (RNXS) as Example-class tenders. When that service was disbanded in 1994, the Examples were transferred to the Royal Navy for similar duties as their Archer-class brethren (under the same names under which they served as "XSVs", all of which begin with the first syllable "Ex"). Until 2005, the four Examples were painted with a black hull.

This brought the total of Archer-class vessels in the Royal Navy to sixteen, of which fourteen form the Coastal Forces Squadron Squadron (formerly the 1st Patrol Boat Squadron), each one formerly attached to an URNU (one per unit) under the command of a lieutenant. The remaining two vessels ( and ), having formed the Cyprus Squadron from 2003 to 2010, and URNU vessels before that, returned to the UK in April 2010 to form the Faslane Patrol Boat Squadron, performing security duties within HMNB Clyde.

These two ships were also used during the Thames River Pageant, escorting the Royal Barge during Queen Elizabeth II's Diamond Jubilee. Unlike the remainder of the class, both these ships remain capable of mounting a 20 mm cannon on the fo'c'sle.

The NATO designation of a P2000 is "PBR", denoting a "Patrol Boat - Riverine and Harbours".

Vessels in the class

See also
 Harbour Defence Motor Launch - World War II equivalent
 
 Patrol Craft Fast - the "Swift Boats"

Notes

References

Bibliography

External links

 
Military boats
Patrol boat classes
Patrol vessels of the Royal Navy
Patrol vessels of the United Kingdom
Riverine warfare
Ship classes of the Royal Navy